|}
David Lloyd Pollock (born 17 November 1942) is a former Australian politician. He was the Country Liberal Party member for MacDonnell in the Northern Territory Legislative Assembly from 1974 to 1977.

References

1942 births
Living people
Members of the Northern Territory Legislative Assembly
Country Liberal Party members of the Northern Territory Legislative Assembly